Jesús Enrique Rejón Aguilar (a.k.a. Z-7, El Mamito) is a former leader of the Mexican criminal organization known as Los Zetas. He was wanted by the governments of Mexico and USA until his capture on July 4, 2011  in Atizapán de Zaragoza, a Mexico City suburb.

Biography 
Rejón Aguilar was born in Sabancuy, Carmen Municipality, Campeche, Mexico, in 1976. On April 3, 1993, Rejón Aguilar entered the Mexican Army in his home state of Campeche and in 1996 was assigned to Special Forces Airmobile Group (GAFE). In 1997, he was assigned to the Mexico's Federal Attorney General's Office (PGR) in the cities of Reynosa and Miguel Alemán in Tamaulipas. In 1998 he was assigned to Saltillo, Coahuila. He deserted the army in February 1999 and in March the same year, at the invitation of Arturo Guzmán Decena, known as "The Z1" was integrated into the group of 14 former soldiers who founded Los Zetas as the armed wing of the Gulf Cartel.

Rejón Aguilar oversaw the paramilitary training of new recruits and then oversaw Gulf Cartel trafficking activities in the state of Coahuila along with Alejandro Treviño Morales. Rejón Aguilar is responsible for multi-ton shipments of marijuana and multi-kilogram shipments of cocaine from Mexico to the United States. In 2004, Rejón Aguilar coordinated a failed raid on the maximum security prison 'El Altiplano', as he attempted to liberate his boss Osiel Cárdenas Guillén. According to government documents, his plan consisted of using 3 helicopters and over 50 Zeta members to liberate Cárdenas Guillén. In 2007 Rejón Aguilar was assigned to the streets of Nuevo Laredo and Miguel Alemán under the command of Miguel Treviño Morales, where he remained until early 2009.

After the split between the Gulf Cartel and Los Zetas in 2010, Rejón Aguilar was assigned as the regional coordinator in the states of central and northern Mexico.

Kingpin Act sanction
On 24 March 2010, the United States Department of the Treasury sanctioned Rejón Aguilar under the Foreign Narcotics Kingpin Designation Act (sometimes referred to simply as the "Kingpin Act"), for his involvement in drug trafficking along with fifty-three other international criminals and ten foreign entities. The act prohibited U.S. citizens and companies from doing any kind of business activity with him, and virtually froze all his assets in the U.S.

Capture
Mexican authorities had posted a $30 million peso (US$2.3 million) bounty for Rejón Aguilar, while the United States posted in July 2009 a US$5 million bounty. On July 4, 2011, police captured Rejón in a Mexico City suburb without firing a shot.

Rejón Aguilar was extradited to the United States on 11 September 2012 for drug trafficking and organized crime charges, pleading guilty for conspiracy to traffic large sums of narcotics to the U.S. in February 2013. He faces a mandatory 10-year sentence and a maximum sentence of life in prison.

See also
 War on Drugs
 Mérida Initiative
 Mexican Drug War

References

Living people
Los Zetas
1976 births
People from Campeche City
People sanctioned under the Foreign Narcotics Kingpin Designation Act
Founding members of Los Zetas